Thomas Edge (born 6 April 1970) is a former association football player who played as a midfielder. He represented the New Zealand national team at international level.

Edge made his full All Whites debut as a substitute in a 1–0 loss to Australia on 12 May 1991 and ended his international playing career with seven A-international caps to his credit, his final cap an appearance in a 3–0 loss to Australia on 15 November 1995.

References

External links
 

1970 births
Living people
New Zealand association footballers
Association football midfielders
New Zealand international footballers
1996 OFC Nations Cup players
Waitakere City FC players